George (Lucky) Whiteman (December 23, 1884 – February 10, 1947) was an outfielder in Major League Baseball, playing mainly as a left fielder for the Boston Americans / Red Sox (1907, 1918) and New York Yankees (1913) between  and . Listed at 5' 7", 160 lb., Whiteman batted and threw right-handed. He was born in Peoria, Illinois.

In a three-season career, Whiteman posted a .271 batting average with one home run and 31 runs batted in in 85 games played.

A 35-year-old minor league journeyman, Whiteman filled in outfield for the Boston Red Sox whenever Babe Ruth was pitching. Prior to the 1918 season, he had played in only 15 major league games since 1907 before becoming the surprise hero of the World Champion Boston team. Although Ruth and Carl Mays won two games apiece in the World Series, Whiteman batted just .250 (5-for-20) against the Chicago Cubs but delivered some key hits and made several run-saving catches in the outfield, specially in the eighth inning of the final game won by the Red Sox, 2–1, at Fenway Park. He never appeared in another major league game after the Series.

Whiteman died in Houston, Texas, at the age of 62.

References

External links

The Boston Globe – It may have been the last title but it was hardly the best

1884 births
1947 deaths
Major League Baseball outfielders
Boston Americans players
Boston Red Sox players
New York Yankees players
Ardmore Boomers players
Cleburne Railroaders players
Galveston Sand Crabs players
Houston Buffaloes managers
Houston Buffaloes players
Joplin Ozarks players
Louisville Colonels (minor league) players
Missoula (minor league baseball) players
Montgomery Climbers players
Montreal Royals players
Oakland Oaks (baseball) players
Toronto Maple Leafs (International League) players
Waco Tigers players
Wichita Falls Spudders players
Salisbury-Spencer Colonials players
Winston-Salem Twins players
Baseball players from Illinois
Sportspeople from Peoria, Illinois